Chichow may refer to:

Locations in China
Jizhou (disambiguation)
Qizhou (disambiguation)

Locations in Iran
Chu Chun, a village in Iran